Monster Land may refer to:

 Waiwai Monster Land (stylized as Y² Monster Land), a 1986 video game released by Epoch for the Super Cassette Vision
 Wonder Boy in Monster Land, the second game in the Wonder Boy series, first released for the arcade in 1987
 Mayhem in Monsterland, a 1993 Commodore 64 game
 Monsterland (Godzilla), a fictional location in the Godzilla film series
 Monsterland (TV series), an American anthology horror television series